American rapper DMX released eight studio albums, seven compilation albums, three mixtapes, 47 singles (including 17 as a featured artist) and 24 music videos.

In 1998, DMX released his debut studio album, It's Dark and Hell Is Hot, peaking at number 1 on the Billboard 200 and being certified 4× Platinum. In the same year, DMX's second album Flesh of My Flesh, Blood of My Blood achieved similar success, selling 3.5 million copies to date. From 1998 to 2003, DMX released five consecutive number 1 albums, including the former two as well as ... And Then There Was X (1999),  The Great Depression (2001) and Grand Champ (2003). Eleven of DMX's solo singles charted on the Billboard Hot 100, including "Ruff Ryders' Anthem", "What's My Name?", "What These Bitches Want", and "Party Up (Up in Here)".

As of June 2014, DMX became the fifth best-selling rap or hip-hop artist of the Nielsen SoundScan era in the United States, with the sales of 23.3 million albums.

Studio albums

Compilation albums

Mixtapes

EPs
 A Dog's Prayers (2021)

Singles

As lead artist

As featured artist

Other charted songs

Guest appearances

Music videos

As lead artist

As featured artist

Notes

References

External links
 
 
 

Hip hop discographies
Discographies of American artists
Disco